Carlyn Kruger (born 12 August 1936) is a Canadian former alpine skier who competed in the 1956 Winter Olympics.

References

1936 births
Living people
Canadian female alpine skiers
Olympic alpine skiers of Canada
Alpine skiers at the 1956 Winter Olympics